ISDN may refer to:

 Integrated Services Digital Network (ISDN)
 Broadband Integrated Services Digital Network (B-ISDN)
 ISDN (album) by The Future Sound of London
 Isosorbide dinitrate, the drug used in the treatment of angina pectoris